Villa Centenario is a district of Lomas de Zamora Partido in Buenos Aires Province, Argentina. It forms part of the Greater Buenos Aires urban conurbation.

External links

Populated places in Buenos Aires Province
Lomas de Zamora Partido